Gracilis, a Latin adjective meaning slender, graceful or gracile, may refer to :

Anatomy
 Fasciculus gracilis or Gracile fasciculus, the tract of Goll, a bundle of axon fibres in the dorsomedial spinal cord
 Gracilis muscle, the most superficial muscle on the medial side of the thigh
 Nucleus gracilis, one of the dorsal column nuclei

Species, subspecies, synonyms, hybrids and varieties

 A. gracilis (disambiguation), numerous species
 B. gracilis (disambiguation), numerous species
 C. gracilis (disambiguation), numerous species
 D. gracilis (disambiguation), numerous species
 E. gracilis (disambiguation), numerous species
 F. gracilis (disambiguation), numerous species
 H. gracilis (disambiguation), numerous species
 J. gracilis (disambiguation), numerous species
 L. gracilis (disambiguation), numerous species
 M. gracilis (disambiguation), numerous species
 Mentha × gracilis – a mint hybrid
 N. gracilis (disambiguation), numerous species
 P. gracilis (disambiguation), numerous species
 S. gracilis (disambiguation), numerous species
 Spiranthes lacera var. gracilis, a subspecies in the orchid species Spiranthes lacera
 T. gracilis (disambiguation), numerous species
 Ulmus minor 'Umbraculifera Gracilis', an elm cultivar
 Uropsilus gracilis, gracile shrew mole
 Urtica dioica subsp. gracilis, the American stinging nettle, a subspecies in the plant species Urtica dioica found in North America
 Utricularia neglecta f. gracilis, a synonym for Utricularia australis, a plant species
 Xantusia gracilis, sandstone night lizard
 Yelovichnus gracilis, a species of enigmatic Ediacaran fossil

See also
 Graciliscincus, a species of Scincidae lizard
 Gracilisuchus, the "graceful crocodile", an extinct genus of tiny crurotarsan (crocodilians ancestors) from the Middle Triassic
 List of Roman cognomina